Chuplani (also Romanized as Chūplānī) is a village in Estarabad-e Shomali Rural District, Baharan District, Gorgan County, Golestan Province, Iran. At the 2006 census, its population was 300, in 67 families.

References 

Populated places in Gorgan County